The 2020 Men's EuroHockey Indoor Club Cup was the 31st edition of the Men's EuroHockey Indoor Club Cup, Europe's premier men's club indoor hockey tournament organized by the European Hockey Federation. It was held from 14 to 16 February 2020 in Poznań, Poland.

Club an der Alster won their third title by defeating Arminen 3–1 in the final. Minsk took the bronze medal by defeating the hosts Grunwald Poznań 4–3 and White Star and the defending champions Partille were relegated to the Trophy division.

Teams
Participating clubs qualified based on their country's final rankings from the 2019 competition. The champions from the top six countries from last year's edition together with the top two from the 2019 EuroHockey Indoor Club Trophy were qualified. Poland and Spain were the two promoted countries that replaced the Netherlands and Switzerland.

Results
All times are local, CET (UTC+1).

Preliminary round

Pool A

Pool B

Fifth to eighth place classification

Pool C
The points obtained in the preliminary round against the other team were taken over.

First to fourth place classification

Semi-finals

Third place game

Final

Final standings

 Relegated to the EuroHockey Indoor Club Trophy

See also
2019–20 Euro Hockey League
2020 Women's EuroHockey Indoor Club Cup

References

Men's EuroHockey Indoor Club Cup
Club Cup
International indoor hockey competitions hosted by Poland
EuroHockey Indoor Club Cup
Sport in Poznań
21st century in Poznań